Pura Gede Perancak is a prominent Hindu sea temple in Perancak, Bali, Indonesia. This temple commemorates the site of Dang Hyang Nirartha's arrival in Bali in 1546. Bull runs are organized here.

References

Hindu temples in Indonesia
Balinese sea temples